Mark Alan Kumpel (born March 7, 1961) is an American former ice hockey player.

Selected by the Quebec Nordiques in the 1980 NHL Entry Draft, Kumpel also played for the Detroit Red Wings and Winnipeg Jets. A member of the 1984 Olympic team, Kumpel retired from the NHL after 288 games played where he totaled 38 goals for 84 points.

After his retirement as a player, Kumpel served as head coach of the Nashville Knights and Dayton Bombers of the ECHL, and was on the Portland Pirates staff from 1998 to 2004. Kumpel also served as a scout for the NHL's Atlanta Thrashers.

Prior to becoming the director of hockey operations for the Eastern Hockey League (EHL) in 2012, Kumpel had a successful five-year tenure as head coach of the Walpole Express Junior A hockey team. Kumpel led the Express to three consecutive Atlantic Junior Hockey League playoff championships (2009–12) and two regular-season titles in (2011 and 2012). In 2019, he left the EHL to take a position with Kunlun Red Star's development team in China.

Career statistics

Regular season and playoffs

International

References

External links

Profile at hockeydraftcentral.com

1961 births
Adirondack Red Wings players
American ice hockey coaches
American men's ice hockey forwards
Detroit Red Wings players
Fredericton Express players
Ice hockey coaches from Massachusetts
Ice hockey players at the 1984 Winter Olympics
Living people
Moncton Hawks players
Olympic ice hockey players of the United States
People from Wakefield, Massachusetts
Providence Bruins players
Quebec Nordiques draft picks
Quebec Nordiques players
Sportspeople from Middlesex County, Massachusetts
Winnipeg Jets (1979–1996) players
UMass Lowell River Hawks men's ice hockey players
Ice hockey players from Massachusetts